Lycksele is a locality and the seat of Lycksele Municipality in Västerbotten County, province of Lapland, Sweden with 8,513 inhabitants in 2010.

History
Lycksele is the oldest lasting Sami settlement in Swedish Lappland. The first Swedish Sami school, Skytteanska skolan, was built here in 1634.

Lycksele was the first place in Swedish Lappland to be designated a city in 1946, hence its nickname "Lapp-Stockholm". Lycksele is, despite its small population, for historical reasons normally still called a city (stad).

Sports
The following sports clubs are based in Lycksele:

 Betsele IF
 Lycksele IF
 Lycksele SK

Notable people
Eva Björklund, politician
Elisabeth Svantesson, Minister for finance
Levi Borgstrom, carver
Melker Karlsson, ice hockey player
John Lindgren, cross-country skier
Figge Norling, actor
David Rundblad, ice hockey player and Stanley Cup winner
Maic Sema, football player
Linn Svahn, cross-country skier
Andreas Wingerli, ice hockey player

Climate
Lycksele has a subarctic climate (Dfc) with short mild summers and long cold and snowy winters. Despite its extremely northern latitude, the climate is relatively mild compared to other places at similar latitude because of the Gulf Stream.

See also
 Blue Highway, an international tourist route

References 

Populated places in Västerbotten County
Populated places in Lycksele Municipality
Municipal seats of Västerbotten County
Swedish municipal seats
Lapland (Sweden)